The 2009 Fresno State football team represented California State University, Fresno and in the 2009 NCAA Division I FBS football season. The team was coached by 13th-year head coach Pat Hill. 2009 was the Bulldogs' 29th in their current home of Bulldog Stadium in Fresno, California. The Bulldogs finished the season 8–5, 6–2 in WAC play and lost to Wyoming 35–28 in two overtimes in the New Mexico Bowl.

Personnel

Coaching Staff

Roster

Schedule

Game summaries

UC Davis

Ryan Colburn wins the starter role at Quarterback after a long offseason battle with Ebahn Feathers and Derek Carr.

1st Quarter
 09:18 FRES- Ryan Colburn 1 Yd Run (Kevin Goessling Kick) 0–7
 06:09 FRES- Ryan Mathews 60 Yd Run (Kevin Goessling Kick) 0–14

2nd Quarter
 07:38 FRES- Nico Herron 94 Yd Interception Return (Kevin Goessling Kick) 0–21
 04:05 FRES- Marlon Moore 92 Yd Pass From Ryan Colburn (Kevin Goessling Kick) 0–28
 00:36 FRES- Ebahn Feathers 20 Yd Run (Kevin Goessling Kick) 0–35

3rd Quarter
 10:18 FRES- Lonyae Miller 3 Yd Run (Kevin Goessling Kick) 0–42
 04:41 FRES- Robbie Rouse 5 Yd Run (Kevin Goessling Kick)0–49

4th Quarter
 11:27 FRES- Joe Trombetta Tackled By David Gory In End Zone Safety 0–51

at Wisconsin

1st Quarter
 06:14 FRES — Chastin West 13 Yd Pass From Ryan Colburn (Kevin Goessling Kick) 7–0

2nd Quarter
 14:46 FRES — Devon Wylie 70 Yd Pass From Ryan Colburn (Kevin Goessling Kick) 14–0
 11:35 WISC — Zach Brown 11 Yd Run (Philip Welch Kick) 14–7
 07:01 FRES — Seyi Ajirotutu 14 Yd Pass From Ryan Colburn (Kevin Goessling Kick) 21–7
 04:27 WISC — David Gilreath 8 Yd Run (Philip Welch Kick) 21–14
 00:00 WISC — Philip Welch 57 Yd FG 21–17

4th Quarter
 05:45 WISC — John Clay 72 Yd Run (Philip Welch Kick) 21–24
 00:16 FRES —  Kevin Goessling 41 Yd FG 24–24

1st Overtime
 WISC — Nick Toon 6 Yd Pass From Scott Tolzien (Philip Welch Kick) 24–31
 FRES — Seyi Ajirotutu 7 Yd Pass From Ryan Colburn (Kevin Goessling Kick) 31–31

2nd Overtime
 WISC — Philip Welch 22 Yd FG 31-34

No. 10 Boise State

1st Quarter
 13:05 BSU — Winston Venable 30 Yd Interception Return (Kyle Brotzman Kick) 7–0
 08:49 BSU — Kyle Brotzman 32 Yd FG 10–0

2nd Quarter
 12:28 BSU — D.J. Harper 60 Yd Run (Kyle Brotzman Kick) 17–0
 09:44 FRES — Kevin Goessling 37 Yd FG 17–3
 07:49 BSU — Titus Young 7 Yd Pass From Kellen Moore (Kyle Brotzman Kick) 24–3
 07:33 FRES — Ryan Mathews 69 Yd Run (Kevin Goessling Kick) 24–10
 04:58 FRES — Ryan Mathews 60 Yd Run (Kevin Goessling Kick) 24–17

3rd Quarter
 12:28 BSU — Kyle Brotzman 30 Yd FG 27–17
 11:39 FRES — Devon Wylie 21 Yd Pass From Ryan Colburn (Kevin Goessling Kick)  27–24
 10:44 BSU — Titus Young Recovered Fumble In End Zone (Kyle Brotzman Kick) 34–24
 03:12 FRES — Kevin Goessling 27 Yd FG 34–27

4th Quarter
 14:14 BSU — Austin Pettis 8 Yd Pass From Kellen Moore (Jimmy Pavel Kick) 41–27
 13:26 FRES — Ryan Mathews 68 Yd Run (Kevin Goessling Kick) 41–34
 13:00 BSU — Jeremy Avery 67 Yd Pass From Kellen Moore (Jimmy Pavel Kick) 48–34
 04:00 BSU — Jimmy Pavel 24 Yd FG 51–34

at No. 15 Cincinnati

1st Quarter
 12:48 CIN — Ben Guidugli 33 Yd Pass From Tony Pike (Jake Rogers Kick) 0–7
 07:47 FRES — Kevin Goessling 36 Yd FG 3–7
 05:58 CIN — Marshwan Gilyard 11 Yd Pass From Tony Pike (Jake Rogers Kick) 3–14

2nd Quarter
 11:48 FRES — Ryan Mathews 1 Yd Run (Kevin Goessling Kick) 10–14
 08:55 CIN — Isaiah Pead 1 Yd Run (Jake Rogers Kick) 10–21
 00:07 FRES — Jamel Hamler 21 Yd Pass From Ryan Colburn (Kevin Goessling Kick) 17–21

4th Quarter
 13:09 CIN — Marshwan Gilyard 23 Yd Pass From Tony Pike (Jake Rogers Kick) 17–28
 08:09 FRES — Kevin Goessling 49 Yd FG 20–28

at Hawaii

1st Quarter
 11:59 FRES — Lonyae Miller 3 Yd Run (Kevin Goessling Kick) 7–0
 06:58 FRES — Ryan Mathews 19 Yd Run (Kevin Goessling Kick)14–0

2nd Quarter
 07:55 FRES — Devon Wylie 17 Yd Pass From Ryan Colburn (Kevin Goessling Kick) 21–0
 03:20 HAW — Scott Enos 33 Yd FG 21–3
 00:11 FRES — Chastin West 17 Yd Pass From Ryan Colburn (Kevin Goessling Kick) 28–3

3rd Quarter
 11:05 FRES — Robbie Rouse 34 Yd Run (Kevin Goessling Kick)35–3
 03:58 FRES — Robbie Rouse 16 Yd Run (Kevin Goessling Kick) 42–3

4th Quarter
 07:25 HAW — Jon Medeiros 1 Yd Pass From Bryant Moniz (Scott Enos Kick) 42–10
 04:42 HAW — Rodney Bradley 4 Yd Pass From Bryant Moniz (Scott Enos Kick) 42–17

San José State

1st Quarter
 13:44 SJSU — Jalal Beauchman 20 Yd Pass From Jordan La Secla (Tyler Cope Kick) 7–0
 07:11 FRES — Devon Wylie 27 Yd Pass From Ryan Colburn (Kevin Goessling Kick) 7–7
 02:06 SJSU — Brandon Rutley 7 Yd Run (Tyler Cope Kick) 14–7

2nd Quarter
 13:11 FRES — Robbie Rouse 3 Yd Run (Kevin Goessling Kick) 14–14
 05:21 FRES — Marlon Moore 23 Yd Pass From Ryan Colburn (Kevin Goessling Kick) 14–21
 01:48 FRES — Ryan Mathews 59 Yd Run (Kevin Goessling Kick) 14–28
 00:00 FRES — Kevin Goessling 40 Yd FG 14–31

4th Quarter
 14:53 FRES — Marlon Moore 4 Yd Pass From Ebahn Feathers (Kevin Goessling Kick) 14–38
 06:56 FRES — Kevin Goessling 46 Yd FG 14–41
 00:09 SJSU — Josh Harrison 59 Yd Pass From Kyle Reed (Tyler Cope Kick) 21–41

at New Mexico State

1st Quarter
 08:36 NMSU- Kyle Hughes 32 Yd FG 0–3

2nd Quarter
 09:54 FRES — Lorne Bell 17 Yd Interception Return (Kevin Goessling Kick)7–3
 06:11 FRES — Kevin Goessling 23 Yd FG 10–3
 00:00 FRES — Kevin Goessling 43 Yd FG 13–3

3rd Quarter
 06:44 FRES — Ryan Mathews 1 Yd Run (Kevin Goessling Kick) 20–3
 03:09 FRES — Chastin West 88 Yd Punt Return (Kevin Goessling Kick) 27–3

4th Quarter
 14:16 FRES — Ryan Mathews 68 Yd Run (Kevin Goessling Kick) 34–3

Utah State

1st Quarter
 11:14 USU — Chris Ulinski 26 Yd FG 3–0
 09:47 FRES — Ryan Mathews 9 Yd Run (Kevin Goessling Kick) 3–7
 08:20 USU — Xavier Bowman 5 Yd Pass From Diondre Borel (Chris Ulinski Kick) 10–7
 04:21 FRES — Seyi Ajirotutu 18 Yd Pass From Ryan Colburn (Kevin Goessling Kick) 10–14

2nd Quarter
 09:48 FRES — Kevin Goessling 50 Yd FG 10–17
 05:02 USU — Robert Turbin 1 Yd Run (Chris Ulinski Kick) 17–17
 01:57 USU — Diondre Borel 1 Yd Run (Chris Ulinski Kick) 24–17
 00:00 USU — Chris Ulinski 23 Yd FG 27–17

3rd Quarter
 08:10 FRES — Lonyae Miller 2 Yd Run (Kevin Goessling Kick) 27–24

4th Quarter
 04:53 FRES — Ryan Mathews 10 Yd Run (Kevin Goessling Kick) 27–31

at Idaho

1st Quarter
 14:41 FRES — Ryan Mathews 77 Yd Run (Kevin Goessling Kick) 7–0
 08:32 FRES — Seyi Ajirotutu 18 Yd Pass From Ryan Colburn (Kevin Goessling Kick) 14–0
 01:26 FRES — Kevin Goessling 52 Yd FG 17–0

2nd Quarter
 01:07 FRES — Ryan Mathews 1 Yd Run (Kevin Goessling Kick) 24–0

3rd Quarter
 05:51 IDHO — Max Komar 14 Yd Pass From Brian Reader (Trey Farquhar Kick) 24–7
 00:47 FRES — Ryan Mathews 1 Yd Run (Kevin Goessling Kick) 31–7

4th Quarter
 12:21 IDHO — Brian Reader 4 Yd Run (Brian Reader Pass To Eric Greenwood For Two-Point Conversion) 31–15
 00:25 IDHO — Maurice Shaw 69 Yd Pass From Brian Reader (Two-Point Pass Conversion Failed) 31–21

at Nevada

1st Quarter
 11:47 FRES — Jamel Hamler 57 Yd Pass From Ryan Colburn (Kevin Goessling Kick) 7–0
 08:52 NEV — Vai Taua 50 Yd Run (Richard Drake Kick) 7–7
 06:24 FRES — Seyi Ajirotutu 3 Yd Pass From Ryan Colburn (Kevin Goessling Kick) 14–7
 00:38 NEV — Richard Drake 40 Yd FG 14–10

2nd Quarter
 06:51 NEV — Luke Lippincott 1 Yd Run (Richard Drake Kick) 14–17
 02:31 NEV — Vai Taua 65 Yd Run (Richard Drake Kick) 14–24

3rd Quarter
 12:07 NEV — Colin Kaepernick 6 Yd Run (Richard Drake Kick) 14–31
 10:40 NEV — Luke Lippincott 27 Yd Run (Richard Drake Kick) 14–38

4th Quarter
 08:54 NEV — Luke Lippincott 4 Yd Run (Richard Drake Kick) 14–45
 07:36 NEV — Colin Kaepernick 21 Yd Run (Richard Drake Kick) 14–52

Louisiana Tech

1st Quarter
 14:37 LT — Dennis Morris 50 Yd Pass From Ross Jenkins (Matt Nelson Kick) 7–0
 07:04 FRES — Seyi Ajirotutu 23 Yd Pass From Ryan Colburn (Kevin Goessling Kick) 7–7
 06:47 FRES — Ben Jacobs 21 Yd Fumble Return (Kevin Goessling Kick) 7–14
 03:07 LT — Dennis Morris 12 Yd Pass From Ross Jenkins (Matt Nelson Kick) 14–14

2nd Quarter
 13:56 FRES — Lonyae Miller 5 Yd Run (Kevin Goessling Kick) 14–21
 10:44 LT — Dennis Morris 39 Yd Pass From Ross Jenkins (Matt Nelson Kick) 21–21

3rd Quarter
 08:27 FRES — Kevin Goessling 24 Yd FG 21–24
 04:51 LT — Cruz Williams 36 Yd Pass From Ross Jenkins (Matt Nelson Kick) 28–24

4th Quarter
 12:50 FRES — Kevin Goessling 23 Yd FG 28–27
 00:00 FRES — Kevin Goessling 35 Yd FG 28–30

at Illinois

1st Quarter
 09:28 ILL — Daniel Dufrene 15 Yd Run (Derek Dimke Kick) 0–7
 01:17 FRES — Ryan Mathews 1 Yd Run (Kevin Goessling Kick) 7–7
2nd Quarter
 14:54 FRES — Phillip Thomas 21 Yd Interception Return (Kevin Goessling Kick) 14–7
 09:00 ILL — Jeff Cumberland 18 Yd Pass From Juice Williams (Derek Dimke Kick) 14–14
 03:30 ILL — Jason Ford 8 Yd Run (Derek Dimke Kick) 14–21
 00:22 FRES — Seyi Ajirotutu 4 Yd Pass From Ryan Colburn (Kevin Goessling Kick) 21–21
 00:08 ILL — Arrelious Benn 58 Yd Pass From Juice Williams (Derek Dimke Kick) 21–28
3rd Quarter
 08:04 ILL — Derek Dimke 44 Yd FG 21–31
 03:51 FRES — Ryan Mathews 1 Yd Run (Kevin Goessling Kick) 28–31
 01:44 FRES — Kevin Goessling 34 Yd FG 31–31
 00:00 ILL — Mikel LeShoure 61 Yd Run (Derek Dimke Kick) 31–38
4th Quarter
 12:56 FRES — Ryan Mathews 27 Yd Run (Kevin Goessling Kick) 38–38
 09:29 ILL — Mikel LeShoure 19 Yd Run (Derek Dimke Kick) 38–45
 08:53 FRES — Ryan Colburn 25 Yd Run (Kevin Goessling Kick) 45–45
 06:14 ILL — Mikel LeShoure 22 Yd Pass From Juice Williams (Derek Dimke Kick) 52–45
 00:02 FRES — Jamel Hamler 19 Yd Pass From Ryan Colburn (Ryan Colburn Pass To Devan Cunningham For Two-Point Conversion) 53–52

vs. Wyoming (New Mexico Bowl)

1st Quarter
 07:37 WYO — Alvester Alexander 68 Yd Run. (Ian Watts Kick) 0–7
2nd Quarter
 12:22 FRES — Ryan Mathews 4 Yd Run. (Kevin Goessling Kick) 7–7
 05:01 WYO — Greg Bolling 21 Yd Pass From Austyn Carta-Samuels. (Ian Watts Kick) 7–14
 00:33 FRES — Jamel Hamler 10 Yd Pass From Ryan Colburn. (Kevin Goessling Kick) 14–14
3rd Quarter
 13:06 FRES — Jamel Hamler 43 Yd Pass From Chastin West. (Kevin Goessling Kick) 21–14
 08:19 WYO — Ian Watts 40 Yd FG 21–17
4th Quarter
 13:59 FRES — Ryan Mathews 5 Yd Run. (Kevin Goessling Kick) 28–17
 10:15 WYO — David Leonard 11 Yd Pass From Austyn Carta-Samuels. (Austyn Carta-Samuels Pass To Greg Bolling For Two-Point Conversion) 28–25
 00:20 WYO — Ian Watts 37 Yd FG 28–28
2nd Overtime
 WYO — David Leonard 13 Yd Pass From Austyn Carta-Samuels. (Ian Watts Kick) 35–28

Awards

All-WAC
First Team Offense
RB Ryan Mathews
OL Andrew Jackson

First Team Defense
DL Chris Carter
LB Ben Jacobs

First Team Specialists
PK Kevin Goessling
P Robert Malone

Second Team Offense
WR Seyi Ajirotutu
OL Kenny Wiggins

Second Team Defense
DB Lorne Bell
DB Moses Harris

Academic All-America Team
First Team
OL Andrew Jackson

Second Team
P Robert Malone

NFL Draft
Running Back Ryan Mathews was drafted by the San Diego Chargers in the 1st round of the 2010 NFL Draft
Corner Back A. J. Jefferson was signed as an undrafted free agent by the Arizona Cardinals

References

Fresno State
Fresno State Bulldogs football seasons
Fresno State Bulldogs football